India competed at the 1948 Summer Olympics in Wembley Park, London, England. 79 competitors, all men, took part in 39 events in 10 sports. It was the first time that India competed as an independent nation at the Olympic Games.

Medalists

Competitors
Note: All times mentioned on this page are in British Summer Time (BST). Indian Standard Time (IST) = BST + 4:30hrs.

Athletics

Boxing

Men

Cycling

 

Ten cyclists represented India in 1948

Individual road race
 Bapoo Malcolm
 Raj Kumar Mehra
 Eruch Mistry
 Homi Powri (Pavri)

Team road race
 Bapoo Malcolm
 Raj Kumar Mehra
 Eruch Mistry
 Homi Powri (Pavri)

Sprint
 Rusi Mulla Feroze

Time trial
 Rohinton Noble

Team pursuit
 Adi Havewala
 Jehangoo Amin
 Rohinton Noble
 Piloo Sarkari (Sarkar)

Also represented India: Netai Chand Bysack

Sohrab Bhoot and Nariman Saugar were administrators for the cycling team.

Field Hockey

The Indian field hockey team defeated the British team to win the country's 
first gold medal at the 1948 Summer Olympics. It was the country's first Olympic gold medal since India became independent.

Squad
Leslie ClaudiusKeshav DuttWalter D'SouzaLawrie FernandesRanganathan FrancisGerry GlackanAkhtar HussainPatrick JansenAmir KumarKishan Lal (c)Leo PintoJaswant Singh RajputLatif-ur-RehmanReginald RodriguesBalbir Singh Sr.Randhir Singh GentleGrahanandan SinghK. D. Singh (vc)Trilochan SinghMaxie Vaz

Group A matches

Semi-finals

Final

Football

Squad
Head coach: Balaidas Chatterjee

First round

Swimming

Water Polo

Indian water polo team ranked 9th in tournament.

Men's Team Competition

 Squad
Gora SealSamarendra ChatterjeeAjoy ChatterjeeSuhas ChatterjeeDwarkadas MukharjiDurga DasJamini DassSachin NagIsaac MansoorJahan Ahir

Round One

Group C matches

Round Two

Group H

Weightlifting

Wrestling

Men's freestyle

See also
 Gold (2018 film), about India's national hockey team at the 1948 Summer Olympics

References

External links
 sports-reference.com

Nations at the 1948 Summer Olympics
1948